Double Dose is a common expression generally meaning double that of the typical amount. It may also refer to:

 Double Dose (Hot Tuna album), 1978
 Double Dose (Tela album), 2002
 Double Dose: Ultimate Hits, a 2011 album by Poison
 "Double Dose" (Superman: The Animated Series), a 1997 episode

See also
 A Double Dose, a 2004 album by Great White
 Dose (disambiguation)